Jacob Kuhrts (August 17, 1832 – January 29, 1926, also spelled Kuhrtz), nicknamed "Uncle Jake," was a sailor, a miner, a teamster, a merchant, a volunteer fire chief and a member of the Los Angeles, California, Common Council, the governing body of that city, during the 19th Century.

Personal

Birth and death
Kuhrts was born on August 17, 1832, in Germany. He died at the age of ninety-three in his home, 1103 Arapahoe Street in today's Pico-Union District, on January 29, 1926, and funeral services were conducted at the Masonic Temple, with interment following in Inglewood Park Cemetery. Honorary pallbearers included Albert Workman, Thomas Strohm, Isidore Dockweiler and John Schumacher.

Family
In a manuscript that Kuhrts wrote in 1906, he recalled how he changed his "wild life to that of a law-abiding citizen." He said that he tried to attend a dance in the Arcadia block but he was turned away at the door because the management would not admit any "desperadoes in here, for this is a German ball, and people have to dress decently."

By this time I took an inventory of myself and found it not very inviting. ... Fancy a man with his pants on the other side of his boots, partly split open from the hip down and tied with a baling rope; a gray shirt not overly clean; a dirty handkerchief around his neck; a big sombrero on his head; not having shaved for two months, very little soap had touched the face up to this time; and a great dragoon pistol on his hip. I came to the conclusion that I did not look very inviting, so back to the corral I went and hunted up my friend, Mike Nolan, a brother teamster. He was the only one who had a boiled shirt and store clothes, as we called them at the time. I found Mike and he loaned me his "duds."

Admitted to the dance, he met sixteen-year-old Susan Buhn of Germany, and they were married on May 29, 1865. They had five children, sons Henry W. Kuhrts, George J. Kuhrts and Edward W. Kuhrts and daughters Emily Krempel and Grace Karstens.

Vocation

Kuhrts left home at the age of twelve and became a sailor, voyaging to England, South America, Australia and China. From the latter country he sailed to Monterey, California, in 1848 and debarked, going to San Francisco to work at the Mission Dolores. He was one of the first to experience the 1849 Gold Rush in Placer County, and remained there until 1857, when he traveled with John Searles from San Francisco with a mule team for the Slate Range near Death Valley.

Kuhrts unloaded his teams at the mines, then made his way on an uncharted route to Los Angeles. He later wrote that he went through Red Rock Cañon, "a place I called El Paso, where I was fortunate enough to find water," thence to Cane Springs, Desert Springs, the "Sinks of Tehachapi," Oak Creek, Willow Springs, Elizabeth Lake, San Francisquito Canyon, over San Fernando Pass, "where it took four yoke of cattle and a windlass to bring my team over the pass into the San Fernando Valley."

From 1857 onward he engaged in a transportation business between Los Angeles and the Slate, where he continued mining until 1864. During that period he fought several skirmishes with Indians and oversaw the work of "Chinamen," who were hired to gather sage-brush and greasewood because "no white man could stand the heat in the summer to do that kind of work." It was also written that he hauled freight as far as Salt Lake City and Butte, Montana.

After settling in Los Angeles, he worked in a lumberyard until 1865, and in that year or in 1866 he opened a retail store at First and Spring Streets (later the site of the Schumacher Block), moving to First and Main in 1870. He retired from business in 1878.

Public service

Kuhrts represented the 2nd Ward on the Los Angeles Common Council in 1875–77 and 1879–80; during the latter period he was council president.
When he was on the council, Kuhrts "used all [his] influence to help the boys in getting horses to draw the apparatus." Previously the fire engines had to be drawn "though the sand by hand." He was chief of the city's volunteer fire department. and when the fire service was reorganized as a paid department, he became a member of the Fire Commission. He was also on the Police Commission. He was a charter member of Al Malaikah Shrine Temple and at his death the last remaining charter member of the local Turnverein Germania society.

Legacy
In 1886 the Jacob Kuhrts Fire Engine Company No. 3 was established, and the Los Angeles Fire Department ordered its first engine, an Amoskeag Steamer, nicknamed the Kuhrts Steamer. It is now on exhibit at the L.A. Fire Department Museum.

There was also a Kuhrts Street between the Los Angeles River and Mission Road. It is now part of Main Street North.

References and notes
Access to the Los Angeles Times links may require the use of a library card.

Other reading
  History of the Los Angeles Turners recounted by Jacob Kuhrts, "Turn-Verein: Laying the Cornerstone of the New Turnhalle," Los Angeles  Times, August 15, 1887, page 1

American fire chiefs
Businesspeople from Los Angeles
Los Angeles Common Council (1850–1889) members
19th-century American politicians
1832 births
1926 deaths
American miners
German emigrants to the United States
Burials at Inglewood Park Cemetery